The Board of Broadcast Governors (BBG) was an arms-length Government of Canada agency. It was created in 1958 by amending the Broadcast Act to regulate television and radio broadcasting, originally taking over that function from the CBC.

The BBG was replaced by the Canadian Radio-television and Telecommunications Commission in the 1968 amendments to the 1958 Act.

Board
The board consisted of 12 members appointed by the federal government:

 3 full-time members
 9 part-time

The head of the board was the Governor.

There had only been two Chairmen:

 Dr. Andrew Stewart November 10, 1958 - March 18, 1968
 Pierre Juneau March 18–31, 1968

History
In 1957, the Progressive Conservative party intended to change the makeup of the Canadian Broadcast system. Up to that point, the Canadian Broadcasting Corporation (CBC) had been responsible for maintaining broadcast infrastructures, creating programs, and regulating the industry. These roles described the CBC as being both "cop and competitor" and were argued to be separated. The regulatory function was thus given over to a separate regulatory agency, the BBG. through the passage of the Broadcast Act (1958).

References

1958 establishments in Canada
1968 disestablishments in Canada
Government agencies established in 1958
Government agencies disestablished in 1968
Mass media regulation in Canada
Former Canadian federal departments and agencies
Broadcasting authorities
Canadian Radio-television and Telecommunications Commission